Antonio Randa (born around Bologna about 1595, died maybe in Ferrara after 1657) was an Italian painter of the classicist period, active in Ferrara, Modena, Rovigo, Florence, Comacchio and his native Bologna.

Biography
Randa first trained with Guido Reni, but afterwards worked under Lucio Massari and later, as a colleague, with the same Massari and with Girolamo Curti. He left Bologna for Modena in 1614 after committing murder.

Many of his paintings are lost.  At present we can see works of him in Milan (Cardinal's residence), San Giorgio di Piano (main church), Gherghenzano (local church), Bologna (Santa Maria della Vita Oratory), San Giovanni in Persiceto (Holy Art Museum), Modena (Estense Gallery),  Rovigo ("Rotonda" church), Florence (altarpiece, two paintings and frescoes in the Certosa del Galluzzo), Comacchio (two altarpieces in the Suffragio church) and in private collections ("St. Cecilia singing"; "Juno and Aeolus at the Cave of the Winds").

In his last known painting, in Comacchio, Randa portrayed himself among the souls in the fires of Purgatory.

The painters Alessandro Provagli (died 1636) and Giuseppe Caletti (called "Cremonese") were his friends.

References

 AGOSTINI, GRAZIA - SCARDINO, LUCIO (a cura di): Inventari d'arte. Documenti su dieci quadrerie ferraresi del XIX secolo, Liberty House, Ferrara, 1997.
 ARFELLI, ADRIANA: Bologna perlustrata di Antonio di Paolo Masini e l’aggiunta inedita del 1690, in «L’Archiginnasio», LII, 1957, pp. 188–236.
 BAROTTI, CESARE: Pitture e scolture che si trovano nelle chiese, luoghi pubblici, e sobborghi della città di Ferrara, appresso Giuseppe Rinaldi, Ferrara, 1770.
 
 Baruffaldi, Girolamo: Vite de’ pittori e scultori ferraresi, coi tipi dell'editore Domenico Taddei, Ferrara, 1844.
 BENATI, DANIELE - PERUZZI, LUCIA (a cura di): Musei Civici di Modena. I dipinti antichi, Franco Cosimo Panini, Modena, 2005.
 BENATI, DANIELE (a cura di): Quadri da collezione. Dipinti emiliani dal XIV al XIX secolo, catalogo della mostra, Fondantico, Bologna, novembre 2013.
 BERETTI, PAOLO: Antonio Randa, pittore bolognese, tesi di laurea in Storia dell’arte, Università di Bologna, anno accademico 2011/2012, con relatori Daniele Benati e Nora Clerici Bagozzi.
 
 CAMPORI, GIUSEPPE: Gli artisti italiani e stranieri negli Stati estensi. Catalogo storico corredato di documenti inediti, Tip.della R.D.Camera, Modena, 1855.
 CLERICI BAGOZZI, NORA - ZAMBONI, ANIELLO (a cura di): I tesori nascosti delle chiese di Comacchio, catalogo della mostra, Corbo, Ferrara, 2000.
 DE BONI, FILIPPO: Biografia degli artisti, Co’ tipi del Gondoliere, Venezia, 1840.
 DE MARCHI, ANDREA G. (a cura di): Il Museo d'Arte Sacra e la Quadreria civica di San Giovanni in Persiceto, Minerva, Argelato, 2008.
 FRIZZI, ANTONIO: Guida del forestiere per la città di Ferrara, Per Francesco Pomatelli al Seminario, Ferrara, 1787.
 FRONGIA, CARLA (a cura di): Guida per la città e i borghi di Ferrara in cinque giornate di Giuseppe Antenore Scalabrini, Liceo classico L.Ariosto, Ferrara, 1997.
 IANNONE, ELENA: Un'aggiunta al catalogo di Antonio Randa, pittore bolognese: la "Sacra famiglia servita dagli angeli" dell'Arcivescovado di Milano, tesi di laurea, Università di Milano, anno accademico 2008/2009, con relatrice Fiorella Frisoni.
 MALVASIA, CARLO CESARE: Felsina pittrice. Vite de' pittori bolognesi, 2 voll., per l’erede di Domenico Barbieri, Bologna, 1678. II ed.: Felsina pittrice. Vite de' pittori bolognesi del conte Carlo Cesare Malvasia con aggiunte, correzioni e note inedite del medesimo autore di Giampietro Zanotti e di altri scrittori viventi, II voll., Tipografia Guidi all’Ancora, Bologna, 1841.
 MARZOCCHI, LEA (a cura di): Scritti originali del Conte Carlo Cesare Malvasia spettanti alla sua Felsina Pittrice, Accademia Clementina di Bologna, Bologna, 1983?
 MASINI, ANTONIO: Bologna perlustrata, Bologna, 1650. II edizione, Bologna 1666.
 NEGRO, EMILIO - PIRONDINI, MASSIMO (a cura di): La scuola di Guido Reni, Artioli, Modena, 1992.
 
 ROSSONI, ELENA - DELL’AMORE, MARIA: La Madonna con Bambino e i santi Geminiano, Carlo Borromeo, Francesco d’Assisi e Ignazio da Loyola di Antonio Randa, Parrocchia dei Santi Geminiano e Benedetto di Gherghenzano - Ministero per i beni e le attività culturali, Bologna, 2011.
 SASSU, GIOVANNI: Oratorio di Santa Maria della Vita, Costa, Bologna, 2001.
 SCALABRINI, GIUSEPPE ANTENORE: Memorie istoriche delle chiese di Ferrara e de' suoi borghi, per Carlo Coatti, Ferrara, 1773.
 SGARBI, VITTORIO: Rovigo. Le chiese, Giunta regionale del Veneto - Marsilio, Venezia, 1988.

External links

1650 deaths
17th-century Italian painters
Italian male painters
Italian Baroque painters
Painters from Bologna
Year of birth uncertain